2005 Japanese Super Cup was the Japanese Super Cup competition. The match was played at International Stadium Yokohama in Kanagawa on February 26, 2005. 

This was the clubs' first Super Cup encounter since their clash in 1984 under their former corporate identities. Tokyo Verdy won the encounter again.

Match details

References

Japanese Super Cup
2005 in Japanese football
Yokohama F. Marinos matches
Tokyo Verdy matches
Japanese Super Cup 2008